Victoria Nolan is a rower for Canada's National Rowing Team.

In 2010, she and her crew (LTA 4+) won gold at the World Rowing Championships in New Zealand.  She competed in the 2008 Summer Paralympics in Beijing, as well as the 2009 World Rowing Championships in Poznan, Poland (2009).  The LTA 4+ crew won bronze, with Victoria Nolan in the stroke seat in Munich, 2007.

She was born in Liverpool on January 3, 1975.
In 2010, Victoria and her teammate from the Paralympics, Meagan Montgomery, won gold in the women's pair event at the world masters rowing championships in Port Dalhousie, Ontario.

Victoria's book, Beyond Vision: The Story of a Blind Rower, was published in 2014 by Iguana Books.

References
 https://rowingcanada.org/team/victoria-nolan/

External links 
 Victoria Nolan - Cœur Handisport

Canadian female rowers
Canadian disabled sportspeople
Living people
World Rowing Championships medalists for Canada
Year of birth missing (living people)
21st-century Canadian women